Colony, in Polish law, is a settlement created due to the expansion of other settlements, usually towns and villages, that is located away from previously existing buildings. It can be counted as a separate settlement rather than part of a previously existing one.

Notes

References 

Types of populated places
Rural geography